Les Ballets Trockadero de Monte Carlo is an all-male drag ballet troupe that parodies the conventions of romantic and classical ballet. The company's current artistic director is Tory Dobrin.

The dancers portray both male and female roles in a humorous style that combines parodies of ballet, posing, and physical comedy with "straighter" pieces intended to show off the performers' technical skills. Much of the humor is the male dancers performing en travesti in roles usually reserved for females, while wearing tutus and dancing en pointe.

History 
Prior to the founding of Les Ballets Trockadero de Monte Carlo, members of Charles Ludlam's Ridiculous Theatre Company formed a company called  the Trockadero Gloxinia Ballet Company in 1972. This company included Larry Ree, Richard Goldberger, Lohr Wilson, Roy Blakey, Peter Anastos, Natch Taylor, and Anthony Bassae. They often performed at La MaMa Experimental Theatre Club in the East Village of Manhattan.

Productions at La MaMa included Sobechenskaya Dances in 1972, multiple productions titled Ekathrina Sobechenskaya Dances with the Troxadero Gloxinia Ballet Company in 1974, and Ekathrina Sobechenskaya Dances with the Original Trockadero Gloxinia Ballet Company in 1975. They continued to perform at La MaMa in 1976 and 1977, then returned in 1982, twice in 1987, and in 1990, with Madame Ekathrina Sobechenskaya's Original Trocadero Gloxinia Ballet.

Les Ballets Trockadero de Monte Carlo was co-founded by Peter Anastos, Natch Taylor, and Anthony Bassae, all of the Trockadero Gloxinia Ballet Company, in 1974. They initially produced small, late-night shows in off-off-Broadway spaces. The troupe's first show was on September 9, 1974 in a second-story loft on 14th Street in the Meatpacking District. After receiving a favorable review in The New Yorker by Arlene Croce, the company was discovered by a wider audience. The "Trocks" toured the world, with prolonged engagements in many major cities.

In 2008, they performed at the Royal Variety Performance in front of Prince Charles. In 2017, the troupe were profiled in Bobbi Jo Hart's documentary film Rebels on Pointe.

Dancers

Notable former dancers 
 Chase Johnsey
 Brock Hayhoe

Repertoire 

From the classical repertoire
 Swan Lake Act II (choreography by Lev Ivanov, music by Pyotr Ilyich Tchaikovsky)
 The Black Swan (Black Swan Pas de Deux from Swan Lake) (choreography after Marius Petipa, music by Tchaikovsky and revised by Riccardo Drigo)
 Don Quixote Act I (choreography after Petipa and Alexander Gorsky, music by Ludwig Minkus)
 Don Quixote Grand Pas de Deux (choreography after Petipa and Gorsky, music by Minkus)
 Le Corsaire Pas de Deux (choreography after Petipa, music by Drigo, Gerber, and Boris Fitinhof-Schell)
 Grand Pas de Trois des Odalisques from Le Corsaire (choreography by Petipa, music by Adolphe Adam and Cesare Pugni)
 Grand Pas de Deux from Act III of The Sleeping Beauty (choreography by Petipa, music by Tchaikovsky)
 The Bluebird from Act III of The Sleeping Beauty (choreography by Petipa, music by Tchaikovsky)
 Pas de Trois from The Fairy Doll (choreography after Sergei Legat and Nikolai Legat, music by Drigo)
 The Little Humpbacked Horse (Grand Ballabile from the Under-water Scene) (choreography by Petipa and Gorsky after Arthur Saint-Léon, music by Pugni)
 Diane and Actéon Pas de Deux (choreography by Agrippina Vaganova, music by Pugni and adapted by Drigo)
 The Nutcracker (choreography by Pamela Pribisco, music by Tchaikovsky)
 Pas de Quatre  (choreography by Anton Dolin after Doin Trutti Gasparinetti, music by Pugni and orchestrated by Leighton Lucas)
 Raymonda's Wedding (Act III of Raymonda (choreography by Konstantin Sergeyev after Petipa, music by Alexander Glazunov)
 Les Sylphides (choreography by Mikhail Fokine, music by Frederic Chopin)
 Flower Festival at Genzano Pas de Deux (choreography by August Bournonville, music by Holger Simon Paulli)
 Grand Pas Classique from Le Dieu et la Bayadère (choreography by Victor Gsovsky, music by Daniel Auber)

Other works
 École de Ballet
 Go for Barocco (parody of George Balanchine's choreography)
 Cross Currents (for 3 dancers)
 The Dance of Liberation
 Gaîté Parisienne
 The Dances of Isadora
 Vivaldi Suite
 La Trovatiara Pas de Cinq (from a lost Giueseppe Verdi opera)
 Yes Virginia, Another Piano Ballet (5 dancers in a rehearsal studio in the style of Jerome Robbins, music by Chopin)
 Stars & Stripes Forever
 Dances of Ruth St. Denis
 Spring Waters
 Debut at the Opera
 Gambol
 I Wanted to Dance With You
 Lamentation of Jane Eyre
 Patterns in Space

Solo works
 The Dying Swan (choreography by Michel Fokine after staging by Trutti Gasparinetti) Debut at the Opera; Ribbon Dance; Russian Dance

References

Reviews

External links
 Les Ballets Trockadero de Monte Carlo official site
 Les Ballets Trockadero de Monte Carlo  at IMG Artists
 Les Ballets Trockadero de Monte Carlo on GLBTQ.com
 Interview with Damien Diaz
 Archive footage of Les Ballets Trockadero de Monte Carlo performing Le Lac des Cygnes (Swan Lake, Act II) in 2010 at Jacob's Pillow
 Photographs of performance at Brooklyn Academy of Music (Dec. 9–16, 1976) and in rehearsal with Shirley MacLaine for TV special "Where do we Go from Here?"
 Trockadero Gloxinia Ballet Company's page on La MaMa Archives Digital Collections

Trockadero de Monte Carlo, Les Ballets
Musical parodies
American drag queens
1974 establishments in New York City
Performing groups established in 1974
Dance companies in New York City
Non-profit organizations based in New York City
LGBT dance